Sainte-Sophie-d'Halifax is a municipality in the Centre-du-Québec region of the province of Quebec in Canada.

Sainte-Sophie-d'Halifax was constituted by the December 17, 1997 amalgamation of the municipality of Sainte-Sophie and the township municipality of Halifax-Nord.

References

Municipalities in Quebec
Incorporated places in Centre-du-Québec